Nenita  is a town in Ionia, Chios, Greece. Nenita belongs to Chios municipality and Ionia municipal unit. Its population is 903 inhabitants according to 2011 census.

History
Nenita is mentioned by European visitors during Ottoman Rule in Greece. It is mentioned as developed and big village. Its name possible derives from the Greek word neonita (νεώνητα) that means new buildings. Nenita suffered great damages during destructive earthquake of 1881. Nowadays, Nenita is a big village of South Chios. The residents employed in agriculture, mostly the agriculture and production of mastic. Nenita is associated with the icon of Archangel Michael

Historical population

References

External links
WebPage for the village

Populated places in Chios